South Dakota's 1st congressional district is an obsolete congressional district that existed from 1913 to 1983.

When South Dakota was admitted into the Union in 1889, it was allocated two congressional seats, both of which were elected state-wide at-large. This continued until South Dakota received a third congressional seat after the 1910 Census, and individual districts were established.

From 1913 until 1933, the newly created 1st District covered 21 counties in southeastern South Dakota, including the state's largest city Sioux Falls. When South Dakota's 3rd congressional district was eliminated after the 1930 Census, the 1st District was expanded to include all of the counties in South Dakota east of the Missouri River. Population changes eventually reduced the district size until it again covered just 21 counties in the eastern part of the state. During the 97th Congress, it included the cities of Aberdeen, Brookings, Sioux Falls, Watertown, Vermillion, and Yankton.

It was eliminated as a result of the redistricting cycle after the 1980 Census.

List of members representing the district

References

 Congressional Biographical Directory of the United States 1774–present

01
Former congressional districts of the United States
Constituencies established in 1913
1913 establishments in South Dakota
Constituencies disestablished in 1983
1983 disestablishments in South Dakota